The American Analog Set (sometimes referred to as AmAnSet) was an Austin-based indie rock, lo-fi band. They have released six studio albums, on the record labels Emperor Jones and Tiger Style Records, with their latest (Set Free) on Arts & Crafts.

History
Formed in 1995, the group's early sound was highly-influenced by krautrock and post-rock and British shoegazer bands like Cocteau Twins, often featuring long instrumental passages. Over time, their songs became shorter and more pop-influenced. The band has released six full-length albums, four EPs, and several vinyl singles.

The group is led by singer/songwriter/guitarist Andrew Kenny. Additional members include, or have included, Lee Gillespie, Mark Smith, Craig McCaffrey, Tom Hoff, Lisa Roschmann, and Sean Ripple. Founding member Roschmann left the band in late 1999; Hoff and Ripple joined in early 2000 and McCaffery replaced Hoff in 2003.

In October 2005, rumors began spreading across the Internet that the group was on the verge of disbanding. The band quickly refuted such rumors, but added that they may not tour again due to their obligations with other projects.

Their latest album, 2005's Set Free, was released in North America by Canadian record label Arts & Crafts.

"Gone to Earth" from Know by Heart was a part of the soundtrack of the 2009 romantic film The Time Traveler's Wife.

Discography

Albums

 The Fun of Watching Fireworks (1996, Emperor Jones)
 From Our Living Room to Yours (1997, Emperor Jones)
 The Golden Band (1999, Emperor Jones)
 Know by Heart (2001, Tiger Style)
 Promise of Love (2003, Tiger Style)
 Set Free (2005, Arts & Crafts)

EPs

 Late One Sunday & The Following Morning (1997, Darla Records; part of Darla's Bliss Out series))
 Updates (2002, Tiger Style) (remixes)
 Songs Of Hurt And Healing (2005, Tylenol/Ouch!)) (Split with White Magic; 3 songs each) (promotional-only)
 Everything Ends in Spring (2005)

Singles

 "Diana Slowburner" (1996, Emperor Jones)
 "Magnificent Seventies" (1997, Emperor Jones)
 "The Only Living Boy Around" (1999)
 "New Equation" (2001, Tiger Style)
 3-way split 7-inch (with The Twilight Singers, Jeff Hanson) (2003, Devil in the Woods) AmAnSet's song: "Hard To Find (Reprise)"

Compilation

 Through The 1990s: Singles And Unreleased (2001, Emperor Jones)
 Hard To Find: Singles And Unreleased 2000-2005 (2009, Hometown Fantasy)

References

External links
MySpace

American post-rock groups
Musical groups from Austin, Texas
Indie rock musical groups from Texas
Arts & Crafts Productions artists
1995 establishments in Texas
Sadcore and slowcore groups
Darla Records artists